Yekta Yılmaz Gül (born December 1, 1978 in Tirebolu, Giresun Province) is a Turkish professional Greco-Roman wrestler, who competed for the men's 120 kg division. He is a member of the İstanbul Büyükşehir Belediyesi S.K. Gül studied at Niğde University.

Gül competed in the Greco-Roman 120 kg event at the 2004 Summer Olympics placing 13th. He won the silver medal at the 2005 European Wrestling Championships in Varna, Bulgaria and at the 2005 Summer Universiade in İzmir, Turkey, and another silver at the Mediterranean Games in Almeria, Spain the same year. At the 2005 World Wrestling Championships held in Budapest, Hungary, he won the bronze medal.

He won the gold medal at the International Grand Prix Greco-Roman Wrestling Tournament held in Székesfehérvár, Hungary in 2006.
Gül won the bronze medal at the 28th International Vehbi Emre Memorial Greco-Roman Tournament held in Istanbul in 2010.

References

External links
 

Turkish male sport wrestlers
1978 births
People from Tirebolu
Living people
Olympic wrestlers of Turkey
Wrestlers at the 2004 Summer Olympics
Istanbul Büyükşehir Belediyespor athletes
Niğde University alumni
World Wrestling Championships medalists
Mediterranean Games silver medalists for Turkey
Competitors at the 2005 Mediterranean Games
Universiade medalists in wrestling
Mediterranean Games medalists in wrestling
Universiade silver medalists for Turkey
European Wrestling Championships medalists
Medalists at the 2005 Summer Universiade
21st-century Turkish people